During World War II, Portable Surgical Hospitals (PSH) were a type of field hospital within the United States Army. They were units of the United States Army Medical Department designed to be man-portable by the team staffing the hospital. Unique to the Pacific Theater of Operations, they were the operational forbearers of the larger, more robust Mobile Army Surgical Hospital (MASH units).

History of the Portable Surgical Hospitals

In February 1942, Colonel Percy J. Carroll, the Chief Surgeon of the US Army Forces, Southwest Pacific Area, found that he had problems integrating large 400 to 750-bed field and evacuation hospitals into troop flow as forces advanced because of the underdeveloped transportation infrastructure and terrain in the Southwest Pacific, particularly in Papua and New Guinea. This limited his ability to move hospitals closely forward behind advancing forces and support combat operations with effective, far-forward surgical care.

During the summer and fall of 1942, at Carroll's direction, a team of Medical Corps officers modified the basic War Department Table of Organization and Equipment (T/O&E) for a standard 25-bed station hospital (T/O&E 8-560, 22 July 1942) into a new theater table of organization and table of basic allowances (T/O, T/BA) (T/O 8-508-S-SWPA, 31 October 1942) for a portable hospital of 25 beds. The new unit was capable of supporting small units in its camp-type version (wits.h 4 female Army nurses and organic vehicles) or battalion and regimental combat teams in its task force version (without the 4 nurses and organic vehicles). Commanded by a Medical Corps captain or major, the new 29-man portable hospital had four medical officers (three general surgeons and a general surgeon/anesthetist) and 25 enlisted men, including two surgical and 11 medical technicians. The PSH had to be flexible in nature and the hospitals consisted of what could be carried with the staff, in addition to their personal gear.

A radical departure was that all of the unit's equipment, medical and surgical supplies, and rations could weigh no more than the 29 men could personally transport. Designed to meet a specific problem at a specific point in time, the Portable Surgical Hospital had several shortcomings. First, the weight limitations meant that it lacked much of the equipment that it needed to conduct definitive surgery. Second, it lacked the capacity to hold patients for any length of time, which could often be called for by the tactical situation. Third, the assigned surgeons lacked the skills and experience necessary to meet the demands on the units, as Carroll often sent younger, less experienced surgeons forward, a departure from the Army's experience in World War I, which showed that less experienced surgeons should be kept at larger facilities to the rear, where they could operate under the tutelage of a more experienced senior staff surgeon. And, finally, the Portable Surgical Hospitals had been stripped so lean that they were never truly self-sufficient, and had to rely on other units for life-support.

The Mobile Army Surgical Hospital, developed after World War II, would address these concerns. One-hundred percent mobile with organic vehicles, with 60 beds and assigned nurses, and fully equipped and supplied to provide definitive care, the MASH built on the experiences of the PSHs of World War II.

List of PSH
1st Portable Surgical Hospital
2nd Portable Surgical Hospital
3rd Portable Surgical Hospital
4th Portable Surgical Hospital
5th Portable Surgical Hospital
6th Portable Surgical Hospital
7th Portable Surgical Hospital
8th Portable Surgical Hospital
9th Portable Surgical Hospital
10th Portable Surgical Hospital
11th Portable Surgical Hospital
12th Portable Surgical Hospital
13th Portable Surgical Hospital
14th Portable Surgical Hospital
15th Portable Surgical Hospital
16th Portable Surgical Hospital
17th Portable Surgical Hospital
18th Portable Surgical Hospital
19th Portable Surgical Hospital
20th Portable Surgical Hospital
21st Portable Surgical Hospital
22nd Portable Surgical Hospital
23rd Portable Surgical Hospital
24th Portable Surgical Hospital
27th Portable Surgical Hospital
28th Portable Surgical Hospital
30th Portable Surgical Hospital
31st Portable Surgical Hospital
32nd Portable Surgical Hospital
33rd Portable Surgical Hospital
35th Portable Surgical Hospital
35th Portable Surgical Hospital
36th Portable Surgical Hospital
38th Portable Surgical Hospital
40th Portable Surgical Hospital
41st Portable Surgical Hospital
42nd Portable Surgical Hospital
43rd Portable Surgical Hospital
44th Portable Surgical Hospital
45th Portable Surgical Hospital
46th Portable Surgical Hospital
47th Portable Surgical Hospital
48th Portable Surgical Hospital
49th Portable Surgical Hospital
50th Portable Surgical Hospital
51st Portable Surgical Hospital
52nd Portable Surgical Hospital
53rd Portable Surgical Hospital
54th Portable Surgical Hospital
55th Portable Surgical Hospital
56th Portable Surgical Hospital
57th Portable Surgical Hospital
58th Portable Surgical Hospital
60th Portable Surgical Hospital
61st Portable Surgical Hospital
62nd Portable Surgical Hospital
63rd Portable Surgical Hospital
64th Portable Surgical Hospital
66th Portable Surgical Hospital
67th Portable Surgical Hospital
95th Portable Surgical Hospital
96th Portable Surgical Hospital
97th Portable Surgical Hospital
98th Portable Surgical Hospital

See also
 List of former United States Army medical units
 Battalion Aid Stations
 Mobile Army Surgical Hospital
 Combat Support Hospital

References

Theobald, Paul. About the 45th Portable Surgical Hospital 1943. Retrieved 2007-03-01.

Hospitals of the United States Army
Surgery